This article lists political parties in the Republic of Artsakh. 
The Republic of Artsakh has a multi-party system with numerous political parties, in which no one party often has a chance of gaining power alone, and parties must work with each other to form coalition governments.

The parties

The following parties won seats in the National Assembly following the 31 March 2020 Artsakhian general election (total 33 seats):

The extra-parliamentary political parties which currently have no seats in the National Assembly, are listed below:
Armenia Our Home (Mer Tun’ Hayastan)
Artsakh Conservative Party
Artsakh Freedom Party
Artsakh Republican Party
Artsakh Revolutionary Party
Communist Party of Artsakh (Artsaki Komunistakan Kusaktsutyun)
Generation of Independence Party
Identity and Unity Party
Moral Revival (Baroyakan Veratsnund)
Movement 88 (Sharzhum 88)
National Revival (Azgayin Veratsnund)
New Artsakh Alliance
Peace and Development Party (Khaghaghutyun yev Zargatsum Kusaktsutsyun)
Powerful United Homeland Party
Social Justice Party (Sotsialakan Ardarutyun Kusaktsutyun)
Tomorrow Artsakh
United Armenia Party

See also
Nagorno-Karabakh:
 Elections in the Republic of Artsakh
 Foreign relations of Artsakh
 National Assembly of Artsakh

General:
 Politics of Artsakh
 Politics of Armenia
 List of political parties in Armenia
 List of political parties by country

 
Artsakh
Artsakh
Political parties